Matthew White Ridley, 1st Viscount Ridley,  (25 July 1842 – 28 November 1904), known as Sir Matthew White Ridley, 5th Baronet, from 1877 to 1900, was a British Conservative statesman. He notably served as Home Secretary from 1895 to 1900.

Background and education
Ridley was born in London, the eldest son of Sir Matthew White Ridley, 4th Baronet, and his wife the Hon. Cecilia Anne, daughter of James Parke, 1st Baron Wensleydale, and his wife Cecilia Arabella Frances Barlow. He was educated at Harrow and Balliol College, Oxford. After graduating with a Bachelor of Arts in 1865, he was a Fellow of All Souls for nine years.

Political career
In 1868, he was elected Conservative Member of Parliament for Northumberland North, and held this seat until the 1885 general election, when he was defeated in his attempt to stand for the new seat of Hexham. At the 1886 general election he contested Newcastle-upon-Tyne, again unsuccessfully, but returned to Parliament in an 1886 by-election at Blackpool. Having been Under-Secretary of State for the Home Department for two years in Disraeli's administration, Sir Matthew Ridley (as he became when he succeeded his father as fifth baronet in 1877) was Financial Secretary to the Treasury in Lord Salisbury's interim government of 1885 to 1886. In 1895, after the fall of Lord Rosebery's ministry, and having already failed in April of that year to be elected Speaker of the House of Commons, Ridley became Home Secretary, and held this post until his retirement in 1900. He was that same year created Viscount Ridley and Baron Wensleydale, of Blagdon and Blyth in the County of Northumberland.

Family
Lord Ridley married Mary Georgiana Marjoribanks (1850 – 14 March 1909), daughter of The 1st Baron Tweedmouth and his wife, Isabella Weir-Hogg, on 10 December 1873. They were parents to five children:

 Matthew White Ridley, 2nd Viscount Ridley (6 December 1874 – 14 February 1916)
 Cecilia Marjorie Ridley (1879 – 16 August 1896)
 Hon. Stella Ridley (18 December 1884 – 8 June 1973), married Rupert Gwynne
 Hon. Sir Jasper Nicholas Ridley (6 January 1887 – 1 October 1951). He was a Knight Commander of the Royal Victorian Order.
 Hon. Grace Ridley (16 February 1889 – 22 September 1959), married The 3rd Earl of Selborne.

Lord Ridley died aged 62 at his Blagdon Hall home in Northumberland, and was buried there.

References

External links 
 
History of the Ridley estate - Blagdon Estate

1842 births
1904 deaths
People educated at Harrow School
Alumni of Balliol College, Oxford
Politicians from London
Members of the Privy Council of the United Kingdom
Viscounts in the Peerage of the United Kingdom
Deputy Lieutenants of Northumberland
Conservative Party (UK) MPs for English constituencies
British Secretaries of State
Secretaries of State for the Home Department
UK MPs 1868–1874
UK MPs 1874–1880
UK MPs 1880–1885
UK MPs 1886–1892
UK MPs 1892–1895
UK MPs 1895–1900
UK MPs who were granted peerages
Matthew
North Eastern Railway (UK) people
Peers of the United Kingdom created by Queen Victoria